West Alvington is a small village, located on the outskirts of Kingsbridge in South Devon on the A381 road. The appropriate electoral ward is called Westville and Alvington. Its population at the 2011 census was 2,042. It has a primary school and is about a 10-minute walk from the centre of Kingsbridge.

History
It was originally part of the manor of Bowringsleigh, which took its name from the Bowring family, who were lords of the manor from about 1330 to the early sixteenth century. At one time, Alvington was part of the Royal Estates; the town of Kingsbridge formed around a bridge which was built in or before the 10th century between the royal estates of Alvington, to the west, and Chillington, to the east, hence giving it the name of Kyngysbrygge ("King's bridge").

Notable residents
Thomas Bowring (died 1504), Lord Chief Justice of Ireland and the principal local landowner.
Robert Bowring (died 1514) eldest son of Thomas, MP for Plymouth.

References

Civil parishes in South Hams
Villages in South Hams